The Newfoundland Rogues are a Canadian professional minor league basketball team based in St. John's, Newfoundland and Labrador. The team competes in The Basketball League (TBL).

Franchise history

Creation and inaugural season 

The franchise was established in 2021 as an ABA expansion team, headed by Tony Kenny, President of 2001 Investments Limited; and coached by Jerry Williams. The team competes in the Basketball League (TBL). 

The team signed a five-year lease to play their homes games at the Mary Brown's Centre in downtown St. John's. Their first game, as part of the ABA's 2021–22 season, took place on November 27 against the New York State's Elmira Eagles, a fellow member of the league's Northeast Division. The Rogues started the season on an unbeaten streak of six matches,. On January 7, 2022 Tony Kenny announced that the next three series were postponed due to enhanced COVID-19 travel restrictions related to the emergence of the Omicron variant. 

On September 15, 2022, Tony Kenny announced that the team would leave the ABA and join The Basketball League for the 2023 season.

Personnel

Current roster

References

External links

Sports teams in Newfoundland and Labrador
 The Basketball League teams
Basketball teams established in 2021
Sport in St. John's, Newfoundland and Labrador
Basketball teams in Canada